The men's 200 metre backstroke event at the 1964 Summer Olympics took place between October 11 and 13. There were 34 competitors from 21 nations, with each nation having up to 3 swimmers. The medals were swept by the United States, with Jed Graef, Gary Dilley, and Bob Bennett taking gold, silver, and bronze respectively.

Background

This was the second appearance of the 200 metre backstroke event. It was first held in 1900. The event did not return until 1964; since then, it has been on the programme at every Summer Games. From 1904 to 1960, a men's 100 metre backstroke was held instead. In 1964, only the 200 metres was held. Beginning in 1968 and ever since, both the 100 and 200 metre versions have been held.

As there were 64 years between the prior edition of this event and this one, no swimmers returned from the 1900 Games. Reigning Olympic champion Ernst Hoppenberg had died in 1937. The American team was so strong that the world record holder, Tom Stock, did not make the team.

16 nations made their debut in the event, while 5 returned from the 1900 Games. Sweden was the only nation that had competed in the event in 1900 that did not compete again in 1964, other than Germany (now competing as the United Team of Germany).

Competition format

The competition used a three-round (heats, semifinals, final) format. The advancement rule followed the format introduced in 1952. A swimmer's place in the heat was not used to determine advancement; instead, the fastest times from across all heats in a round were used. There were 9 heats of 7 or 8 swimmers each. The top 24 swimmers advanced to the semifinals. There were 3 semifinals of 8 swimmers each. The top 8 swimmers advanced to the final. Swim-offs were used as necessary to break ties.

This swimming event used backstroke. Because an Olympic size swimming pool is 50 metres long, this race consisted of four lengths of the pool.

Records

These were the standing world and Olympic records (in seconds) prior to the 1964 Summer Olympics.

The Olympic record was 64 years old, as the event had not been held since the 1900 Games. In the first heat, Bob Bennett broke the record by over 30 seconds, swimming an unrushed 2:16.1. The Olympic record continued to drop throughout the heats and semifinals (with only one of the 7 races in the first two rounds not resulting the record being broken). Shigeo Fukushima swam 2:14.7 in heat 2, Jed Graef 2:14.5 in heat 3, Gary Dilley 2:14.2 in heat 5, Dilley 2:13.8 in semifinal 1, and Graef 2:13.7 in semifinal 2. In the final, Graef and Dilley both broke the world record; the former took gold and the new record with 2:10.3.

Schedule

Results

Heats

Five heats were held; the fastest sixteen swimmers advanced to the semifinals.

Semifinals

Two heats were held; the fastest eight swimmers advanced to the final.

Final

References

Men's backstroke 200 metre
200 metre backstroke at the Olympics
Men's events at the 1964 Summer Olympics